Valentin Baillifard (born 25 December 1993) is a Swiss former professional cyclist.

Major results

2010
 1st  Junior race, National Hill Climb Championships
2011
 1st  Junior race, National Hill Climb Championships
2012
 1st  Junior race, National Hill Climb Championships
2015
 1st  Combination classification, Tour des Pays de Savoie
2017
 3rd Overall Sibiu Cycling Tour
 6th Overall Tour of Almaty

References

External links

1993 births
Living people
Swiss male cyclists
People from Bagnes